B-52 Memorial Park is located within the Orlando International Airport just off the Beachline Expressway formerly the Bee Line near runway 18L.  It is a small, relatively hidden park under the control of the Greater Orlando Aviation Authority (GOAA) and features a retired B-52D Stratofortress, Air Force Serial Number 56-0687, from the Strategic Air Command.  The aircraft was at one time assigned to the 306th Bomb Wing of the now defunct McCoy Air Force Base. The bomber was built in 1956 and retired 28 years later in 1984. Final flight was from its last unit of assignment, the 7th Bomb Wing at Carswell AFB in Fort Worth, Texas, to the former McCoy AFB, now Orlando International Airport, on February 20, 1984.

The park is located on Bear Road, accessible from Tradeport Drive just south of Beachline/SR 528 Exit 4, around the corner from where the old Orlando Jetport terminal, the predecessor to the current Orlando International Airport terminal, used to stand. The park is open from 7:00am to sunset, and is free of charge to visit. The park also contains a memorial for the Airport Authority's K-9s adjacent to the B-52.

External links 

Photos of plane in the park

Parks in Orange County, Florida
Tourist attractions in Orlando, Florida
Monuments and memorials in Florida
Orlando International Airport